Dorcadion crassicolle is a species of beetle in the family Cerambycidae. It was described by Pesarini and Sabbadini in 2007. It is known from Greece.

References

crassicolle
Beetles described in 2007